Free Blockbuster is a nonprofit organization that promotes neighborhood movie exchanges. There are over 160 Free Blockbuster Boxes across the United States. Typically, Free Blockbuster Boxes are made by upcycling abandoned newspaper distribution boxes. They use the brand name Blockbuster on the boxes.

See also
Blockbuster (Bend, Oregon), the final Blockbuster store still in operation, as of 2023
Community fridge
Little Free Library
Mutual aid
Public bookcase, for history and generic aspects of the practice

References

External links

Sharing economy
Charities based in California
Organizations established in 2018
2018 establishments in California